Aleksandr Dobrzhansky (19 April 1873 – 15 November 1937) was a Georgian sports shooter. He competed in seven events at the 1912 Summer Olympics, representing the Russian Empire.

References

1873 births
1937 deaths

Olympic competitors for the Russian Empire
Shooters at the 1912 Summer Olympics
Sportspeople from Tbilisi
Sportspeople from the Russian Empire